The Ministry of Economic Development  was a former ministry of the Government of Sri Lanka, and was a member ministry of the cabinet of Sri Lanka. It was briefly merged with several other ministries and renamed the Ministry of Policy Planning, Economics Affairs, Child, Youth and Cultural Affairs from January 2015 onwards, before being replaced by the Ministry of National Policies and Economic Affairs in August 2015.

Ministers

Parties

References

External links
 Government of Sri Lanka

Economic Development
Economic Development